Michael Hüther (born 24 April 1962) is a German economist who currently serves as director of the Institut der deutschen Wirtschaft. He has previously been the chief economist of DekaBank. Hüther also is an honorary professor at the European Business School International University Schloss Reichartshausen.

Education
Hüther received his doctoral degree in economics from the University of Giessen in 1990 and also studied at the University of East Anglia.

Career
From 1990 to 1999 Hüther was a research assistant for the German Council of Economic Experts. Since 2004 he serves as director of the IW.

In April 2020, Hüther was appointed by Minister-President Armin Laschet of North Rhine-Westphalia to a 12-member expert group to advise on economic and social consequences of the COVID-19 pandemic in Germany.

Other activities (selection)

Corporate boards
 TÜV Rheinland, Chairman of the Supervisory Board (since 2019)
 Allianz Global Investors, Member of the European Supervisory Board
 Deutsche Bank, Member of the Advisory Board (since 2017)
 TÜV Rheinland Berlin Brandenburg Pfalz, Member of the Board of Directors (since 2016)
 Fraport, Member of the Economic Advisory Board

Non-profit organizations
 Federation of German Industries (BDI), Member of the Presidium (2017-2018)
 Wirtschaftsrat der CDU, Member of the Scientific Advisory Board
 Free Democratic Party (FDP), Member of the Business Forum
 Association of Private Higher Education Institutions (VPH), Member of the Board of Trustees
 Atlantik-Brücke, Member of the Board
 Foundation of German Industry (SDW), Member of the Board of Trustees (since 2013)
 German Institute of Development and Sustainability (IDOS), Member of the Board of Trustees
 Research Center for International and Interdisciplinary Theology (FIIT) at the Heidelberg University, Member of the Advisory Board (since 2010)
 Max Planck Institute for the Study of Societies (MPIfG), Member of the Board of Trustees (since 2009)
 Herbert Giersch Stiftung, Member of the Advisory Board
 Institute for Banking and Financial History (IBF), Member of the Board of Trustees
 Friedrich and Isabel Vogel Foundation, Member of the Board of Trustees (since 2005)

References

External links
 Expert Directory at the Institut der deutschen Wirtschaft

1962 births
Living people
University of Giessen alumni
Alumni of the University of East Anglia
20th-century German economists